Horace Grocott  (7 April 1880 – 10 July 1963) was a New Zealand Baptist missionary, Boys' Brigade leader, and postmaster. He was born in Napier, New Zealand. Grocott was a missionary in Bolivia from 1909 to 1914.

In the 1952 Queen's Birthday Honours, Grocott was appointed a Member of the Order of the British Empire, for services to the Boys' Brigade movement in New Zealand.

References

1880 births
1963 deaths
New Zealand Baptist missionaries
New Zealand postmasters
People from Napier, New Zealand
Baptist missionaries in Bolivia
New Zealand Members of the Order of the British Empire
20th-century Baptists